Bentley Park College is a co-educational, state run school located in Bentley Park, Queensland, Australia.  The school educates students from preschool to 12th grade and first opened in 1998.

The school first opened its doors to preschool age students in 1997, followed by the primary school in 1998.  In 2001, the school began accepting middle school students (grades 6–9) and senior school students (grades 10–12) in 2002.  In 2003–2004, senior school students moved into their own building apart from the middle school students.

In 2005, there were approximately 1800 students enrolled in the school, 400 of which were senior school students.

In 2011, the middle school was removed paving the way for year 7 to transition into high school ahead of other schools in the area.

See also
List of schools in North Queensland

References

External links 
 Bentley Park College website

Public high schools in Queensland
Educational institutions established in 1997
Schools in Cairns
1997 establishments in Australia